William Henry Monk (16 March 1823 – 1 March 1889) was an English organist, church musician and music editor who composed popular hymn tunes, including "Eventide", used for the hymn "Abide with Me", and "All Things Bright and Beautiful". He also wrote music for church services and anthems.

Biography

William Henry Monk was born in London on 16 March 1823. His youth is not well-documented, but it seems that he developed quickly on the keyboard, but perhaps less so in composition.

By age 18, Monk was organist at St Peter's Church, Eaton Square (Central London). He left after two years, and moved on to two more organist posts in London (St George's Church, Albemarle Street, and St Paul's Church, Portman Square). He spent two years in each. Each served as a stepping stone toward fostering his musical ambitions.

In 1847, Monk became choirmaster at King's College London. There he developed an interest in incorporating plainchant into Anglican services, an idea suggested by William Dyce, a King's College professor with whom Monk had much contact. In 1849, Monk also became organist at King's College.

In 1852, he became organist and choirmaster at St Matthias' Church, Stoke Newington, where he made many changes: plainchant was used in singing psalms, and the music performed was more appropriate to the church calendar. By now, Monk was also arranging hymns, as well as writing his own hymn melodies. In 1857, his talents as composer, arranger, and editor were recognized when he was appointed the musical editor of Hymns Ancient and Modern, a volume first published in 1861, containing 273 hymns. After supplements were added (second edition, 1875; later additions or supplements, 1889, 1904, and 1916) it became one of the best-selling hymn books ever produced. It was for this publication that Monk supplied his famous "Eventide" tune which is mostly used for the hymn "Abide with Me", as well as several others, including "Gethsemane", "Ascension", and "St Denys".  The well-known hymn 'God, that madest earth and heaven' by Bishop Heber and Archbishop Whately, two of the greatest Regency-era clergymen, was set to music in Monk's tune Nutfield.  He was also responsible for the tune St Matthias often used for the hymn 'Sweet Saviour, bless us ere we go.'  The late Victorian Anglo-Saxon revivalist tune St Ethelwald was put to the immortal words of the prolific writer Charles Wesley called 'Soldiers of Christ, arise.'

In 1874, Monk was appointed professor of vocal studies at King's College; subsequently he accepted similar posts at two other prestigious London music schools: the first at the National Training School for Music in 1876, and the second at Bedford College in 1878. Monk remained active in composition in his later years, writing not only hymn tunes but also anthems and other works. In 1882 Durham University awarded him an honorary Mus. Doc.

He died on 1 March 1889 and was buried on the eastern side of Highgate Cemetery in north London.

References

External links

 
 
 
 
 
 

1823 births
1889 deaths
Burials at Highgate Cemetery
Musicians from London
Hymnal editors
English composers
English organists
British male organists
Academics of King's College London
19th-century British composers
19th-century English musicians
19th-century British male musicians
19th-century organists